Carmelo Javier Ríos Santiago (born May 21, 1973 in San Juan, Puerto Rico) is a Puerto Rican politician, lawyer and senator. He has been a member of the Senate of Puerto Rico since 2005.

Early years and studies

Carmelo Ríos was born on May 21, 1973 in Santurce, Puerto Rico to Carmelo Ríos Nazario and Lydia Santiago Estrella. He studied at the Ramón Marín Elementary School in Guaynabo and in 1991, he entered Florida Air Academy in the US. 

That same year, he started his college studies in Orlando receiving an associate degree in Economy from Valencia Community College. In 1993, he transferred to Bethune-Cookman University in Daytona Beach, Florida where he obtained a Bachelor's degree in Political Science and Economy.

In 1995, he entered the Law Faculty of the Pontifical Catholic University of Puerto Rico School of Law becoming part of the Student Bar Association and the Law Students National Association and the Council of Students. In 1998, he obtained his Juris doctor.

Professional career

Ríos started working as a lawyer, and as a legal aide of the Commissioner of Municipal Affairs, and Director of the Lawsuit Division of the Corporation of State Insurance Fund. In 2001, he started his own law firm specializing in Administrative, Civil, and Penal Law.

Political career

Ríos started his political career in 1999, when he ran for Guaynabo's Legislative Assembly, where he was elected Majority Speaker. In November 2004, he was elected as Senator for the District of Bayamón, where he presided the Municipal and Financial Affairs Commission.

In November 2008, he was reelected for a second term. He presided the Government Commission. He was also Vice-president of the Commission of Municipal Affairs, Secretary of the Commission of Public Safety and Judicial Affairs, Consumer Affairs and Public Corporations during his first years. He was reelected in 2012 and 2016. 

He currently presides the Commission of Rules and Calendars. 

Carmelo Ríos ran for mayor of Guaynabo on August 5, 2017 in a special election to replace former Mayor Hector O'Neill, but lost against Angel Perez.

In 2018, Ríos was selected to be President of the National Hispanic Caucus of State Legislators.

In 2020, he was elected as an at-large member of the Democratic Party of Puerto Rico.

References

External links
Hon. Carmelo Rios on SenadoPR

1973 births
Bethune–Cookman University alumni
Democratic Party (Puerto Rico) politicians
Living people
Members of the Senate of Puerto Rico
People from San Juan, Puerto Rico
Pontifical Catholic University of Puerto Rico alumni
Puerto Rican lawyers
Valencia College alumni